Visakhapatnam is the city of South Indian State of Andhra Pradesh. old MCV are is consider as Central part of city, East and Some Western Parts of city. Visakhapatnam city divided as North, South, central, East, West and suburbs of Northern, Southern and Western.

Central Visakhapatnam
Central Visakhapatnam is mainly commercial and residential neighbourhood's major commercial areas are Dwaraka Nagar, Asilmetta, Daba Gardens and Siripuram

 Dwaraka Nagar
 Daba Gardens
 Asilmetta
 Siripuram
 Pithapuram Colony
 CBM Compound
 Maddilapalem
 Narasimha Nagar
 Balayya Sastri Layout
 Kailasapuram
 Seethammadhara
 Resapuvanipalem
 HB Colony
 Ramnagar
 Santhipuram
 Suryabagh
 Railway New Colony
 Venkojipalem
 Seethammapeta
 Waltair Uplands
 Dondaparthy
 Gnanapuram
 Akkayyapalem
 Shivaji Palem
 Thatichetlapalem
 Kancharapalem
 Isukathota

North Visakhapatnam
North Visakhapatnam is Residential and IT hub this areas developed so rapidly in past years important areas are Rushikonda, Yendada, PM Palem and Madhurawada

 Kommadi
 Rushikonda
 Sagar Nagar
 Yendada
 Madhurawada
 PM Palem
 Thimmapuram
 Jodugullapalem
 Kapuluppada
 Gambhiram
 Anandapuram
 Mangamaripeta

South Visakhapatnam
South Visakhapatnam is  mainly residential, commercial and developed industrial Neighborhoods, important localities are Gajuwaka, Kurmannapalem, Duvvada and  Sheela Nagar

 Gajuwaka
 Pedagantyada
 Kurmannapalem
 Akkireddypalem
 Nathayyapalem
 Yarada
 Aganampudi
 Chinagantyada
 Nadupuru
 Duvvada
 Desapatrunipalem
 Sheela Nagar
 Sriharipuram
 Tunglam
 Mulagada
 Vadlapudi
 Ukkunagaram (Steel Plant Township)
 Gandhigram
 Gangavaram
 BHPV
 Mindi
 Scindia
 Malkapuram

West Visakhapatnam  
West Visakhapatnam is completely residential areas important areas are Pendurthi, Muralinagar, Sujatha Nagar and Gopalapatnam

 Gopalapatnam
 Naidu Thota
 Vepagunta
 Marripalem
 Simhachalam
 Prahaladapuram
 Pendurthi
 Chintalagraharam
 NAD
 Madhavadhara
 Sujatha Nagar
 Adavivaram
 Muralinagar
 Chinnamushidiwada
 Kakani Nagar
 Narava
 Pineapple Colony

East Visakhapatnam
East Visakhapatnam is residential and commercial areas and   important neighborhoods are Maharanipeta, Jagadamba Centre, MVP Colony and Pandurangapuram.

 Jagadamba Centre
 Soldierpet 
 MVP Colony
 Velampeta
 Chinna Waltair
 Kirlampudi Layout
 Pandurangapuram
 Daspalla Hills
 Town Kotha Road
 Peda Waltair
 Lawsons Bay Colony
 Prakashraopeta
 Burujupeta
 Jalari Peta
 One Town
 Poorna Market
 Allipuram
 Salipeta
 Relli Veedhi
 Maharanipeta
 Chengal Rao Peta

North West Visakhapatnam
mainly developed residential and health city important areas are Arilova, Chinna Gadhili and Hanumanthavaka

 Chinna Gadhili
 Visalakshi Nagar
 Arilova
 Ravindra Nagar
 Hanumanthavaka
 Adarsh Nagar

Northern Suburbs
newly developing areas and mostly residential areas 

 Padmanabham
 Gidijala
 Gudilova
 Tagarapuvalasa
 Bheemunipatnam
 Nidigattu
 Vellanki
 Sontyam

Southern Suburbs
this southern suburbs are consist major industrial areas 

 Pudimadaka
 Dosuru
 Anakapalli
 Pedamadaka
 Duppituru
 Ravada
 Devada
 Lankelapalem
 Parawada
 Appikonda
 Atchutapuram

Western Suburbs
western suburb is newly developing residential areas and educational hub 

 Sabbavaram
 Devipuram
 Kothavalasa

References 

 
Visakhapatnam
Neighbourhoods in Visakhapatnam